Spanish–American War Soldier is a public art work created by the American Bronze Company and located in downtown Milwaukee, Wisconsin. The bronze figure depicts a uniformed soldier with an ammunition belt around his waist and a rifle in hand. The inscription on its plinth reads, "To those who served in the war with Spain, 1898 - 1902." It is located in the middle of West Wisconsin Avenue between North 9th and 10th Streets in the Court of Honor near the Milwaukee Public Library.

See also 
Spanish–American War

References

1932 establishments in Wisconsin
1932 sculptures
Bronze sculptures in Wisconsin
Military monuments and memorials in the United States
Monuments and memorials in Wisconsin
Outdoor sculptures in Milwaukee
Sculptures of men in Wisconsin
Statues in Wisconsin